The 19333 / 19334 Indore - Bikaner Mahamana Express is an express train belonging to Western Railway zone that runs between Indore Junction and Bikaner Junction in India.

It is currently being operated with 19333/19334 train numbers on a weekly basis.

Coach Composition

The train has standard ICF rakes with max speed of 110 kmph. The train consists of 16 coaches :

 1 AC II Tier
 2 AC III Tier
 7 Sleeper Coaches
 4 General Unreserved
 2 Seating cum Luggage Rake

Service

The 19333/Indore - Bikaner Mahamana Express has an average speed of 50 km/hr and covers 962 km in 19h 15m.

The 19334/Bikaner - Indore Mahamana Express has an average speed of 48 km/hr and covers 962 km in 20h 10m.

Route & Halts

Schedule

Rake Sharing

The train shares its rake with 19319/19320 Veraval - Indore Mahamana Express.

Traction

It is hauled by a Ratlam based diesel locomotive WDM 3A on its entire journey.

See also

 Bikaner Junction railway station
 Indore Junction railway station
 Mahamana Express
 Bhopal - Khajuraho Mahamana Superfast Express
 Varanasi - New Delhi Mahamana Express
 Vadodara - Varanasi Mahamana Express

References

Notes

External links
19333/Indore - Bikaner Mahamana Express
19334/Bikaner - Indore Mahamana Express

Rail transport in Rajasthan
Rail transport in Madhya Pradesh
Transport in Indore
Transport in Bikaner
Mahamana Express trains
Memorials to Madan Mohan Malaviya
Railway services introduced in 2019